Music Tapes for Clouds and Tornadoes is an album by The Music Tapes, a project consisting mainly of Neutral Milk Hotel's Julian Koster, released in 2008 by Merge Records.  Koster spent nine years recording the album using mainly antique hardware and such as a 1895 Edison wax cylinder recorder, a 1940s wire recorder, a "state of the art hard drive", and reel to reel tape recorders.

Track listing
"Saw Pingpong And Orchestra" – 1:23
"Schedrevka" – 0:54
"Freeing Song For Reindeer" – 2:59
"Majesty" – 2:44
"Nimbus Stratus Cirrus (Mr.Piano’s Majestic Haircut)" – 2:45
"Freeing Song By Reindeer" – 3:13
"Tornado Longing For Freedom" – 3:57
"Song For Oceans Falling" – 6:04
"Kolyada #1" – 0:53
"The Minister Of Longitude" – 4:46
"Manifest Destiny" – 3:37
"Kolyada #2" – 1:00
"Cumulonimbus (Magnetic Tape For Clouds)" – 4:47
"Julian And Grandpa" – 0:31
"In An Ice Palace" – 3:39

External links
Official site of The Music Tapes
Merge Records site for Music Tapes for Clouds and Tornadoes
Streaming mp3s of Music Tapes for Clouds and Tornadoes
Merge Records site for The Music Tapes

References

2008 albums
Merge Records albums
The Music Tapes albums